The Preparation is a 2017 South Korean drama film directed by Cho Young-jun, starring Go Doo-shim and Kim Sung-kyun.

Plot

In Yongin, South Korea, Ae-soon is a mother of the intellectually-disabled In-gyu. Both live in a small apartment and have a happy life, however In-gyu's traits often mildly inflame Ae-soon.

Cast
Go Doo-shim as Ae-soon 
Kim Sung-kyun as In-gyu
Yoo Sun as Moon-kyeong 
Park Chul-min as Subsection chief Park 
Kim Hee-jung as Jeong-ja 
Hyun Bong-shik as Eun-cheol 
Shin Se-kyung as Kyeong-ran (special appearance)

Production 
Principal photography began in Yongin on April 10, 2017, and wrapped on June 7, 2017.

References

External links

2017 films
2017 drama films
South Korean drama films
Films about cancer
Films about intellectual disability
2010s South Korean films